Steep Marsh is a small village in the civil parish of Steep  situated in the South Downs Area of Outstanding Natural Beauty in the East Hampshire district of Hampshire, England. Its nearest town is Petersfield, which lies approximately 2 miles (3.2 km) south from the village.

Villages in Hampshire